Glenea anticepunctata is a species of beetle in the family Cerambycidae. It was described by James Thomson in 1857. It is known from Borneo, Sumatra, India and Malaysia.

Varietas
 Glenea anticepunctata var. janthoides Breuning, 1956
 Glenea anticepunctata var. mediovitticollis Breuning, 1956
 Glenea anticepunctata var. obsoletepunctata (Thomson, 1857)

References

anticepunctata
Beetles described in 1857